Capacities of brewery casks were formerly measured and standardised according to a specific system of English units. In United Kingdom and its colonies, with the adoption of the imperial system in 1824, the units were redefined in terms of the slightly smaller imperial gallon. The older units continued in use in the United States.

Historically the terms beer and ale referred to distinct brews. From the mid 15th century until 1803 in Britain "ale" casks and "beer" casks differed in the number of gallons they contained.

Units

Tun
Invented in Brentford, a tun was used in local breweries to measure large amounts of alcohol.

Butt (Imperial)

Hogshead
The hogshead of beer and ale was equal to a quarter of a tun, half a butt, a tierce and a half, or three kilderkins. This unit is close in size to the wine hogshead.

hogshead (Ale)
In the mid-15th century the ale hogshead was defined as 48 ale or beer gallons (221.8 L). In 1688 the ale hogshead was redefined to be 51 ale or beer gallons (235.7 L). In 1803 the ale hogshead was again redefined to be 54 ale or beer gallons (249.5 L), equivalent to the beer hogshead.

hogshead (Beer)
From the mid 15th century until 1824 the beer hogshead was defined as 54 ale or beer gallons.

hogshead (Ale) (Imperial), hogshead (Beer) (Imperial)
In the United Kingdom and its colonies, with the 1824 adoption of the imperial system, the ale or beer hogshead was redefined to be 54 imperial gallons.

Barrel
This is somewhat larger than the wine barrel.

barrel (Ale)
As with the hogshead the ale barrel underwent various redefinitions.  Initially 32 ale or beer gallons (147.9 L), it was redefined in 1688 as 34 ale or beer gallons (157.1 L) and again in 1803 as 36 ale or beer gallons (166.4 L).

barrel (Beer)
The beer barrel was defined as 36 ale or beer gallons until the adoption of the imperial system.

barrel (Ale) (Imperial), barrel (Beer) (Imperial)
The adoption of the imperial system saw the beer or ale barrel redefined to be 36 imperial gallons, which is exactly 

Kilderkin
The kilderkin (from the Dutch for "small cask") is equal to half a barrel or two firkins.

kilderkin (Ale)
The ale kilderkin likewise underwent various redefinitions.  Initially 16 ale or beer gallons (73.94 L), it was redefined in 1688 as 17 ale or beer gallons (78.56 L) and again in 1803 as 18 ale or beer gallons (83.18 L).

kilderkin (Beer)
Until the adoption of the imperial system the beer kilderkin was defined as 18 ale or beer gallons.

kilderkin (Ale) (Imperial), kilderkin (Beer) (Imperial)

The kilderkin is still currently used. It is the unit of choice of CAMRA, the Campaign for Real Ale, for calculating beer quantities for beer festivals in the UK. Ales are usually delivered in firkins, cider and other drinks are usually in boxes, bottles or other containers measured in gallons or litres, and all (except wine) are sold in pints or parts thereof. For CAMRA internal accounting, all are calculated in kilderkins. A kilderkin is a 144 pint container but there is not 144 pints of cask conditioned consumable beer in a kilderkin (see Firkins below for explanation).

Firkin
The ale or beer firkin (from Middle Dutch  meaning "fourth") is a quarter of an ale or beer barrel or half a kilderkin.  This unit is much smaller than the wine firkin. Casks in this size (themselves called firkins) are the most common container for cask ale.

firkin (Ale)
From the mid 15th century until 1688 the ale firkin was defined as 8 ale or beer gallons (36.97 litres).  In 1688 the ale firkin was redefined to be  ale or beer gallons (39.28 L). In 1803 ale firkin was again redefined to be 9 ale or beer gallons (41.59 L), equivalent to the beer firkin.

firkin (Beer)
From the mid 15th century until 1824 the beer firkin was defined as 9 ale or beer gallons.

firkin (Ale) (Imperial), firkin (Beer) (Imperial)
The beer or ale firkin was redefined to be 9 imperial gallons in 1824. It is therefore exactly  or approximately .Most English cask conditioned beer bought by publicans is delivered in 72 pint containers (i.e. Firkin) but the volume of consumable beer in the container is far lower. For example a 72 pint container of Greene King IPA currently only has 66 "full" pints of consumable beer that can be sold or drunk, the other 6 pints are sediment, finings, beer stone, hops, proteins or less than an imperial measure and therefore not consumable or saleable. HMRC does not charge duty on any portion of beer that cannot be consumed, brewers should make a declaration to the first customer (i.e. publican) to inform them what are the actual duty paid contents of the beer so customers are fully aware of how much is being sold to them.

Pin (Imperial)
A pin is equal to half a firkin. Plastic versions of these casks are known as "polypins" and are popular in homebrewing and the off-trade (deliveries for home consumption). They are also popular at beer festivals where non-standard beers are sold.

Gallon
Originally the 282-cubic-inch ale or beer gallon was used.  With the adoption of the imperial system in the United Kingdom and its colonies, the system was redefined in terms of the imperial gallon.

Chart

See also

 English wine cask units
 List of unusual units of measurement
 Units of measurement

References

Notes

Units of volume
Alcohol measurement